The mixed 50 metre rifle, prone was a shooting sports event held as part of the Shooting at the 1980 Summer Olympics programme. It was the fourteenth appearance of the event. The competition was held on 21 July 1980 at the shooting ranges in Moscow. 56 shooters from 32 nations competed. Gold medallist Károly Varga broke his shooting hand in a football match two days before the competition started, and had to wear a bandage over it when competing. He said that the injury actually helped him, because he was forced to squeeze the trigger more delicately. The event was technically mixed, although no women competed. Mixed events were abolished after 1980, with women-only events being introduced instead.

Results

References

Shooting at the 1980 Summer Olympics
Men's 050m prone 1980